A butterfly joint, also called a bow tie, dovetail key, Dutchman joint, or Nakashima joint, is a type of joint or inlay used to hold two or more pieces of woods together. These types of joints are mainly used for aesthetics, but they can also be used to reinforce cracks in pieces of wood, doors, picture frames, or drawers.

A dovetail key resembles two dovetails connected at the narrow part. A negative of the hole is cut out of the board the butterfly will be placed in and the butterfly is then fitted, keeping the joint together. The wood used for the butterfly is usually a contrasting wood, often walnut.

History

Dutchman Joint 
The term Dutchman is used when a patch or inlay covers a miss-cut or an imperfect piece of wood. A Dutchman can also cover a knot in the wood. A Dutchman can be wood or metal. The origin of the name is from San Francisco after the gold rush. All types of European craftsmen came to California to earn a living. The term Dutchman is slang given to the woodworking process of inserting patches. The term Dutchman has been found in the literature of John Russell Bartlett in the Dictionary of Americanisms and Edward H. Knight's American Mechanical Dictionary.

Dovetail Key 
In 1894, Jacques De Morgan discovered a group of boats at the pyramid complex of Khakaure Senwosret III at Dahshur. Butterfly, or dovetail, joints were recorded as being used. Some archeologists argue that the dovetail joints were not originally fitted for the boats but were a modern replacement. The dovetail joints look to have been set into the faces of the planks to provide strength, after the excavation, so that it would not fall apart during transport. The craftsmanship of the joints was not what had been seen for the rest of the boats, they were also not fixed in place. Any type of force could cause the joint to fall out. There was also no mention of the joints in the original notes by Morgan taken when he first saw the boats. It is unlikely that if they were present, that he would have missed them. There have been reports of traditional Japanese boats using butterfly cramps but these were held in place by shellac.

Modern use 
Contemporary decorative dovetail keys are commonly seen in and associated with the work of George Nakashima. George Nakashima, a Japanese-American woodworker, made the butterfly joint famous in the 1950s. He incorporated it into his nature-inspired woodworking pieces. Nakashima's idea was to not change the wood, only enhance its beauty.

How a Butterfly Joint is made
Butterfly joints are often made using a bandsaw. The piece of wood must be cut out, then sanded down to the proper size. The joint is then traced out onto another piece of wood. This piece of wood is what the end project will be made out of. Using a palm router or a chisel, the traced pattern is cut out of the wood. The joint is placed into the hole and glued down.

Notes

External links 
 A simple illustration of a butterfly joint 

Joinery
Woodworking